Proper Patola is a Punjabi romantic comedy film directed by Harish Vyas. The film has an ensemble cast which includes Neeru Bajwa, Harish Verma, Yuvraj Hans. It was written and co-directed by Amit Saxena. The film was distributed by OmJee Cineworld.

Cast

 Neeru Bajwa as Preet and Jeet (double role)
 Harish Verma as Raj
 Yuvraj Hans as Yuvi

Marketing
The trailer of the film was released on YouTube on 1 November 2014

Awards

PTC Punjabi Film Awards 2015

Pending
PTC Punjabi Film Award for Best Editing - Gurjant Singh / Vicky Singh
PTC Punjabi Film Award for Best Screenplay - Harish Vyas / Amit Saxena
PTC Punjabi Film Award for Best Performance in a Comic Role - Teji Sandhu
PTC Punjabi Film Award for Best Debut Director - Harish Vyas
PTC Punjabi Film Award for Best Actress - Neeru Bajwa

References

External links 
 Official Facebook
 Official Twitter
 

2014 films
Punjabi-language Indian films
2010s Punjabi-language films
Films scored by Jassi Katyal
Films scored by Saurabh Kalsi